Rhynchospora longisetis is a species of plant in the family Cyperaceae first described by Robert Brown. No subspecies listed in the Catalogue of Life.

References

longiseta